Santo Augusto is a municipality in Rio Grande do Sul, Brazil, in the micro region of Ijuí.  As of 2020, the estimated population was 13,848.

See also
List of municipalities in Rio Grande do Sul

References

Municipalities in Rio Grande do Sul